The 1980 Lacoste Cup, also known as the Cologne Grand Prix, was a men's tennis tournament played on indoor carpet courts in Cologne, West Germany that was part of the 1980 Volvo Grand Prix circuit. It was the fifth edition of the tournament and was held from 27 October through 2 November 1980. Fourth-seeded Bob Lutz won the singles title.

Finals

Singles
 Bob Lutz defeated  Nick Saviano 6–4, 6–0
 It was Lutz' 3rd singles title of the year and the 11th and last of his career.

Doubles
 Andrew Pattison /  Bernard Mitton defeated  Jan Kodeš /  Tomáš Šmíd 6–4, 6–1

References

External links
 ITF tournament edition details

Cologne Cup
Cologne Cup